The 58th annual Berlin International Film Festival was held from February 7 to February 17, 2008. The festival opened with Martin Scorsese's documentary film Shine a Light. Be Kind Rewind by Michel Gondry served as the closing film. Greek-French filmmaker Costa Gavras, was selected to serve as the Jury President at the festival.

The Golden Bear was awarded to Brazilian film Tropa de Elite directed by José Padilha. The retrospective dedicated to Spanish film-maker Luis Buñuel was shown at the festival.

Jury 

The following people were announced as being on the jury for the festival:

International jury
 Costa-Gavras, director, screenwriter and producer (Greece) - Jury President
 Uli Hanisch, production designer (Germany)
 Diane Kruger, actress (Germany)
 Walter Murch, director and editor (United States)
 Shu Qi, actress and model (Taiwan)
 Alexander Rodnyansky, producer (Russia)

Best First Feature Award Jury
 Ben Barenholtz, producer and distributor (United States)
 Dominique Cabrera, director and screenwriter (France)
 Jasmila Žbanić, director, screenwriter and producer (Bosnia and Herzegovina)

International Short Film Jury
 Marc Barbé, actor and director (France)
 Ada Solomon, producer (Romania)
 Laura Tonke, actress (Germany)

In competition 
The following films were in competition for the Golden Bear and Silver Bear awards:

Key
{| class="wikitable" width="550" colspan="1"
| style="background:#FFDEAD;" align="center"| †
|Winner of the main award for best film in its section
|-
| colspan="2"| The opening and closing films are screened during the opening and closing ceremonies respectively.
|}

Awards 

The following prizes were awarded by the Jury:

Golden Bear
Golden Bear for Best Film – Tropa de Elite by José Padilha

Silver Bears
 Jury Grand Prix (Grand Prize of the Jury): Standard Operating Procedure by Errol Morris 
 Best Director:  Paul Thomas Anderson for There Will Be Blood
 Best Actor: Reza Naji for Avaze gonjeshk-ha 
 Best Actress: Sally Hawkins for Happy-Go-Lucky 
 Best Script: Wang Xiaoshuai for In Love We Trust
 Outstanding Artistic Contribution: For the Music of There Will Be Blood by Jonny Greenwood 
Alfred Bauer Prize: Fernando Eimbcke for Lake Tahoe 
FIPRESCI Award: Fernando Eimbcke for Lake Tahoe

References

External links

 58th Berlin International Film Festival 2008
 Yearbook 2008 at berlinale.de

Berlin International Film Festival
B
B
2008 in Berlin
2008 in German cinema